Xocchel Municipality (in the Yucatec Maya Language: “counting jays”) is one of the 106 municipalities in the Mexican state of Yucatán containing  (53.65 km2) of land and located roughly 45 km southeast of the city of Mérida.

History
During pre-Hispanic times, the area was part of the chieftainship of Ah Kin Chel. After the conquest the area became part of the encomienda system. In 1753, two women were the encomenderas for Xocchel, Catalina Guerrero y Ulbarri and María Enríquez de Novoa, responsible for 207 indigenous people.

Yucatán declared its independence from the Spanish Crown in 1821. On 30 November 1840 a partition was made assigning Xocchel to the Izamal Municipality. In 1988, it was made its own municipality.

Governance
The municipal president is elected for a three year term. The town council has four councilpersons, who serve as Secretary and councilors of public service, nomenclature, cemeteries, and parks.

Communities
The head of the municipality is Xocchel, Yucatán. The other populated areas are Much, El Paraíso, Santa Cruz, X-lelbé, and Yaxquil. The significant populations are shown below:

Local festivals
Every year from 24 to 29 June, the feast of San Juan Bautista, patron saint of the village, is held.

Tourist attractions
 Church of San Juan Bautista

References

Municipalities of Yucatán